Ojay George Miller, better known as Mayhem and Mayhem NODB (commonly stylised as MaYHeM NODB), is a grime MC from Birmingham, England. He is one of the founding members of NODB alongside Deadly.

Early life
Mayhem started rapping in primary school and by the time he was 14 he was performing at dances and raves. He rose to prominence in Birmingham with the song "Pum Pum Punashum".

Music
NODB was the first grime group from Birmingham to feature on BBC 1Xtra this helped to popularise grime in Birmingham and the wider West Midlands. In 2011 Mayhem was released from Prison and he created and released his first CD "Mr Splash" in 2012   when Mr Splash was released Mayhem was confused and angry after just being released from Prison, it features a gritty sound. Mayhem's second album was titled "Its Peakum" which was released in 2013 and features a more accessible sound when compared to Mr Splash and in 2015 the mixtape "Gassum" was released which features London MC Big Narstie and Deadly.

Feud with Wiley

In 2012 Wiley released "Step 2 Freestyle" in which Mayhem alleged that Wiley  copied his style by using "UM" at the ends of words something which Mayhem has been known for. Mayhem was angered by Wiley stating that he did not know who he was, however, Mayhem claims they performed at various raves together. Wiley  then followed up with his track Step 6 and at 1.22 of the track he reaffirms that he did not know who Mayhem was. Mayhem responded with a video titled "Mayhem NODB Replies to the Cat Wiley

CDs and Mixtapes

References

Living people
Black British male rappers
English male rappers
English record producers
Grime music artists
Rappers from Birmingham, West Midlands
Year of birth missing (living people)